The Nkhula B Hydroelectric Power Station, also Nkula B Hydroelectric Power Station is a hydroelectric power plant on the Shire River in Malawi.

Location
The geographical coordinates of Nkhula B Power Station are: 15°31'40.0"S, 34°49'14.0"E (Latitude:-15.527778; Longitude:34.820556).

Overview
Nkhula B Power Station was built in stages in the 1980s and the 1990s. The first three power generators of 20 megawatts each, were installed in 1980. Another 20 megawatt generator was added in 1986. The fifth 20 MW turbine was installed in 1992.

The power station was closed for major repairs in March 2017. Those renovations included the construction of a new switch-yard and power house. The work was carried out by Andritz Hydro of Austria and Mota-Engil of Portugal.

In 2018, the inlet valve to the power station, valued at MWK:800,000,000 (approx. €1.18 million) was replaced.

See also

 List of power stations in Malawi
 List of power stations in Africa

References

External links
Energy supply in Malawi: Options and issues As of May 2015.

Nkhula B
Hydroelectric power stations in Malawi
Energy infrastructure completed in 1992
1992 establishments in Malawi